HMS Ursa was a modified Admiralty  destroyer that served in the Royal Navy during the First World War. The Modified R class added attributes of the Yarrow Later M class to improve the capability of the ships to operate in bad weather. Launched in 1917, the vessel saw service as part of the Grand Fleet. The destroyer took part in the Second Battle of Heligoland Bight while being commanded by Commander John Tovey, who later became Admiral of the Fleet and led the successful action against the battleship Bismark. The vessel was also one of the first destroyers to launch a torpedo at the enemy during the battle. After the war, Ursa was transferred to the Home Fleet, but was sold to be broken up in 1928.

Design and development

Ursa was one of eleven Modified  destroyers ordered by the British Admiralty in March 1916 as part of the Eighth War Construction Programme. The design was a development of the existing R class, adding features from the Yarrow Later M class which had been introduced based on wartime experience. The forward two boilers were transposed and vented through a single funnel, enabling the bridge and forward gun to be placed further aft. Combined with hull-strengthening, this improved the destroyers' ability to operate at high speed in bad weather.

Two funnels were fitted.

Armament consisted of three single  Mk V QF guns on the ship's centreline, with one on the forecastle, one aft on a raised platform and one between the funnels. A single 2-pounder  "pom-pom anti-aircraft gun was carried on a platform between two twin mounts for  torpedoes. The ship had a complement of 82 officers and ratings.

Construction and careers
Laid down  by Palmers Shipbuilding and Iron Company in Jarrow, Ursa was launched on 23 July 1917 and completed on 16 October. The vessel was the first of the name. On commissioning, Ursa joined the Thirteenth Destroyer Flotilla of the Grand Fleet, On 28 September 1917, Commander John Tovey took over command of the vessel, a position that he held until 2 April 1918.

It was while commanding Ursa that Tovey was awarded the Croix de Guerre  "for distinguished services rendered during the war". At the end of World War I, the destroyer was still part of the  Thirteenth Destroyer Flotilla under the cruiser .

In 1923, the Navy decided to retire many of the older destroyers in preparation for the introduction of newer and larger vessels. Ursa was sold to J. Smith on 13 July 1928 and broken up.

Pennant numbers

References

Citations

Bibliography

 
 
 
 
 
 

 

1917 ships
Ships built on the River Tyne
R-class destroyers (1916)
World War I destroyers of the United Kingdom